The 2008 Tunis Open was a 2008 ATP Challenger Series tennis tournament. Thomaz Bellucci won the singles tournament.

Seeds

Draw

Final four

Section 1

Section 2

External links
 International Tennis Federation (ITF) – tournament edition details

2008 Singles
2008 ATP Challenger Series